The LGM-35 Sentinel, also known as the Ground Based Strategic Deterrent (GBSD), is a future American land-based intercontinental ballistic missile system (ICBM) currently in the early stages of development. It is slated to replace Minuteman III missiles, currently stationed in North Dakota, Wyoming, Montana, Nebraska, and Colorado, from 2029 through 2075. In 2020 the Department of the Air Force awarded defense contractor Northrop Grumman a $13.3 billion sole-source contract for development of the LGM-35 after Boeing withdrew its proposal. Northrop Grumman's subcontractors on the LGM-35 include Lockheed Martin, General Dynamics, Bechtel, Honeywell, Aerojet Rocketdyne, Parsons, Textron, and others.

History 
In 2010, the ICBM Coalition, legislators from states that house nuclear missiles, told President Obama they would not support ratification of the New START treaty with Russia unless Obama agreed to revamp the US nuclear triad: nuclear missiles that could be launched from land, sea, and air. In a written statement, President Obama agreed to "modernize or replace" all three legs of the triad.

A request for proposal for development and maintenance of a next-generation nuclear ICBM was made by the US Air Force Nuclear Weapons Center in July 2016. The GBSD would replace the Minuteman III, which was first deployed in 1970, in the land-based portion of the US nuclear triad. The new missiles, to be phased in over a decade from the late 2020s, are estimated over a fifty-year life cycle to cost around $264 billion. Boeing and Northrop Grumman competed for the contract.

In August 2017, the Air Force awarded three-year development contracts to Boeing and Northrop Grumman for $349 million and $329 million, respectively. One of these companies was to be selected to produce a ground-based nuclear ICBM in 2020. In 2029, the GBSD program is expected to enter service and remain active until 2075.

On 25 July 2019, Boeing announced it would not place a bid for the program, citing Northrop's recent acquisition of Orbital ATK (now Northrop Grumman Innovation Systems), Boeing's supplier of solid rocket motors. Northrop signed an agreement to firewall Boeing's proprietary data after acquiring Orbital ATK. The Air Force has since halted funding for the Boeing project, leaving Northrop Grumman as the sole bidder.

In December 2019, it was announced that Northrop Grumman won the competition to build the future ICBM. Northrop won by default, as their bid was the only one left to be considered for the GBSD program. The Air Force said that they will "proceed with an aggressive and effective sole-source negotiation" in reference to Northrop's bid.

On 8 September 2020, the Department of the Air Force awarded Northrop Grumman a $13.3 billion contract to develop the GBSD intercontinental ballistic missile. Work on the GBSD missiles will be done in Roy and Promontory, Utah; Huntsville and Montgomery, Alabama; Colorado Springs, Colorado; Bellevue, Nebraska; San Diego and Woodland Hills, California; Vandenberg Space Force Base, California; Chandler, Arizona; Annapolis Junction, Maryland; and other locations.

In April 2022, the GBSD's official designation was announced: The LGM-35A Sentinel.

Warhead
In March 2019, the W87 Mod 1 (W87-1) thermonuclear warhead was selected for GBSD, replacing the W78 warhead currently used on the Minuteman III. It is planned for GBSD to deploy in 2028, with W87-0 warheads initially being fitted to the system and W87-1 warheads being fitted from 2030 onward. This affords the Air Force a small amount of flexibility if the W87-1 is delayed.

Testing 
GBSD testing would occur mainly at Hill Air Force Base, Utah, and at Vandenberg Space Force Base (VSFB), California, with missile launches from VSFB over the Pacific Ocean. Additional testing would be conducted at U.S. Army Dugway Proving Ground, Utah, U.S. Army Garrison–Kwajalein Atoll and within the territorial waters of the Republic of the Marshall Islands.

On 7 July 2022, a Minotaur II+ rocket launched from Vandenberg TP-01 for a suborbital reentry vehicle (Mk21A reentry vehicle belonging to AFNWC) demonstration mission for the future LGM-35A Sentinel intercontinental ballistic missile. The rocket exploded 11 seconds after launch.

Debate

Pro 
Supporters of the GBSD include the Heritage Foundation, Secretary of Defense Lloyd Austin, former Secretary of Defense Ash Carter and members of Congress in the "ICBM Coalition." They argue that the current ICBMs, first introduced in the 1970s, have had their life extended long enough and need to be replaced with a modular system in which components are easier to replace or update. In defending the importance of land-based missiles, supporters say they are the least expensive leg of the nuclear triad because they do not necessitate large maintenance crews or incur expensive refueling costs, like nuclear-powered submarines. Additionally, they argue land-based missiles are visible reminders that the US can strike back in the event of a nuclear attack, thus making them essential to nuclear deterrence.

In its annual 2021 Threat Assessment, the US Intelligence community said China was planning to double its arsenal of nuclear weapons over the next ten years in "the most rapid expansion in its history." It also warned that Russia may expand and modernize its nuclear arsenal.

One of the main supporters of the GBSD is Senator Jon Tester (D-MT), Chair of the Senate Appropriations Subcommittee on Defense. In a March 21, 2021, interview with Defense News, Tester said, "As of right now, I think it's important that we move forward with the GBSD because I believe there's still an important deterrent." Jennifer Granholm, Secretary of Energy in the Biden administration, told the press on April 9, 2021, "We have to keep and maintain the stockpile to make sure that it is safe and effective, and we will continue to do that to ensure that we can deter nuclear aggression from other countries."

Con 
GBSD critics include former Secretary of Defense William Perry; Daniel Ellsberg, Pentagon Papers whistleblower and author of The Doomsday Machine: Confessions of a Nuclear War Planner; the Friends Committee on National Legislation (FCNL); the Union of Concerned Scientists (UCS); the Federation of American Scientists (FAS); and Peace Action. They argue that the new missiles would be not only costly, but also dangerous, increasing the risk of accidentally launching a nuclear war. Critics say that ICBMs, which are supposed to act like a sponge drawing enemy fire to deplete Russia's nuclear power, could result in the deaths of more than 10 million people. Ellsberg and author Norman Solomon argue that peace groups must oppose not only the GBSD but also the entire land-based leg of the nuclear triad to reduce the threat of an accidental nuclear war.

Physicist David Wright, former co-director of the UCS Global Security Program, in his report Rethinking Land-Based Nuclear Missiles, writes that submarine-launched ballistic missiles (SLBMs) are as accurate, if not more, than land-based missiles, and are "virtually undetectable," making the ICBMs not only obsolete but also sitting ducks in the five states that house ICBMs. Wright concludes that the vulnerability of ICBMs has prompted the Air Force to keep them on high alert, which is dangerous and could trigger a nuclear war. According to William Hartung, author of Prophets of War: Lockheed Martin and the Making of the Military-Industrial Complex, a president would have only minutes to decide whether to launch ICBMs in a crisis so that the missiles would not be destroyed in a first strike.

Polling 
In 2020, the Program for Public Consultation at the University of Maryland, issued a report entitled Common Ground of the American People, which was a compilation of studies conducted over the previous five years, collecting data from nearly 86,000 individuals who were polled on the GBSD. Sixty-one percent of Americans–including both Democratic and Republican majorities–said they supported phasing out the United States' 400 land-based intercontinental ballistic missiles.

Another 2020 poll conducted by the Federation of American Scientists and ReThink Media found a majority of both Republicans and Democrats favored alternative solutions to the GBSD, including extending the life of the Minuteman III ICBM. Over 800 registered voters were surveyed, with an oversampling of 200 registered voters in ICBM states: Colorado, Montana, North Dakota, Nebraska and Wyoming. When respondents were asked, "What do you think the government should do about ICBMs?", 30 percent favored updating existing ICBMs rather than replacing them, 26 percent supported the GBSD, 20 percent preferred eliminating the ICBMs and 10 percent supported abolishing all nuclear weapons.

According to a 2021 survey commissioned by the Mitchell Institute for Aerospace Studies, the majority of voters believe that nuclear deterrence capability should be one of the highest priorities for the Department of Defense, with a majority also supporting modernization efforts. The survey asked more than 2,000 voters for their views on national security and nuclear arms. Eighty-one percent of survey respondents preferred the security benefits of the United States' ground-based nuclear capabilities more than the cost savings of removing these capabilities. When told the current Minuteman III ICBM system is over 50 years old, the majority of respondents said the ICBMs should be replaced by a modern system, compared to 23 percent who said the ICBMs should be refurbished to extend their current life. Just five percent indicated an opinion that they should be eliminated entirely. When informed that Russia and China have modernized their nuclear arsenals, support for replacing Minuteman III with a modern ICBM system rose to 65 percent, compared to only 15 percent in favor of refurbishing.

ICBM Coalition 
The ICBM Coalition in Congress, which lobbies for the GBSD, was able to limit the reduction of deployed land-based missiles to 50 in the New Strategic Arms Reduction Treaty (START). As of May 2021, membership in the coalition included senators from states that will either house or develop the proposed GBSD missiles: Co-Chair, Sen. John Hoeven (R-ND); Co-Chair, Sen. Jon Tester (D-MT); Sen. John Barrasso (R-WY); Sen. Steve Daines (R-MT); Sen. Mike Lee (R-UT); Sen. Mike Rounds (R-SD).

Tester serves as Chair of the Senate Appropriations defense subcommittee. During a spring 2021 event hosted by the Washington, D.C.-based Advanced Nuclear Weapons Alliance, Tester said he was committed to keeping the GBSD "on track" though added there will be debate about the proposed new missiles during the 2022 defense appropriations process.

According to the Arms Control Association, Caucus Senators received the following contributions from military contractors from 2012-2020: Romney ($645,000); Tester ($102,360); Barasso ($89,000); Daines ($85, 948); Enzi ($68,500); Cramer ($49,593). In total, military contractors have donated $1.2 million to the current members of the Senate ICBM Coalition and more than $15 million to the 64 members of the influential committees, the Senate and House Armed Services strategic forces subcommittees and the Senate and House Appropriations defense subcommittees, that can decide the fate of ICBM legislation. ICBM contractors are also engaged in lobbying representatives in Congress, with corporate backers of GBSD employing 380 lobbyists, according to the Arms Control Association.

References

External links
 Defense Primer: GBSD Capabilities (Congressional Research Service)
 GBSD Information from manufacturer

Embedded systems
Intercontinental ballistic missiles of the United States
Nuclear weapons of the United States
MIRV capable missiles